Zakir Sabirov (born 1951) is a Tajikistani artist. His works are held in museums and private collections of Tajikistan, Russia and Asia.

References

Tajikistani artists
1951 births
Living people
Place of birth missing (living people)
Date of birth missing (living people)